Thaddeus Robert Rudolph Mann (4 December 1908 – 27 November 1993) was a biochemist who made significant contributions to the field of reproductive biology.  Mann was born in Lwow, Austria-Hungary (now Ukraine) and was educated at Lwow University. He studied medicine at the Johannes Casimirus University in Lwow, obtaining the degrees of Physician in 1932 and Doctor of Medicine in 1934.

He continued his education at the Molteno Institute, Cambridge on a Rockefeller Fellowship, 1935-1937, and remained at the University of Cambridge during the rest of his career. He died in Cambridge.

Mann began his career in the laboratory of Professor Jacob Karol Parnas (1884-1949) in Poland, where he was involved in research on glycolysis and muscle energy metabolism.

He was elected a Fellow of the Royal Society in 1951.

He was married to Cecilia Lutwak-Mann, an endocrinologist and physiologist.

Publications
Thaddeus Mann published more than 250 papers, and several books.

Further reading
Ostrowski WS (1990) Thaddeus Mann. Life and work. Andrologia. 1990;22 Suppl 1:3–9.

References

External links

1993 deaths
1908 births
Fellows of the Royal Society